Legislative elections took place on 23 and 30 November 1958 to elect the first National Assembly of the French Fifth Republic.

Since 1954, the French Fourth Republic had been mired in the Algerian War. In May 1958, Pierre Pflimlin, a Christian-Democrat, became Prime Minister. He was known to be in favour of a negotiated settlement with the Algerian nationalists.
On 13 May riots broke out in Algiers, with the complicity of the army. A rebel government seized power in Algiers in order to defend "French Algeria". The next day, General Massu demanded the return to power of General Charles de Gaulle.

The rebellious generals took control of Corsica threatening to conduct an assault on Paris, involving paratroopers and armoured forces based at Rambouillet. In Paris, the political leaders were trying to find a compromise. On 1 June De Gaulle replaced Pflimlin to lead a government of national unity and nominated as Ministers of State (Vice-Prime Ministers) Pierre Pflimlin (Popular Republican Movement, MRP), Guy Mollet (French Section of the Workers' International (SFIO), Louis Jacquinot (National Center of Independents and Peasants, CNIP) and Félix Houphouët-Boigny. He obtained the right to develop a new Constitution. Only the Communists and some center-left politicians such as Pierre Mendès-France and François Mitterrand, opposed this "coup against the Republic".

On 28 September the new Constitution was approved in a referendum in the French Union by 82.6% of all voters, and in metropolitan France by 79.3% of voters. The Fifth Republic was born. The two-round system was re-established for the legislative elections. The Gaullists created the Union for the New Republic which became the largest parliamentary group. Their opponents were crushed. The small number of left-wing MPs elected may be explained by divisions among left-leaning parties between supporters and opponents to the Fifth Republic: the two-round ballot tends to reward parties which are able to form alliances with each other.

On 21 December de Gaulle was elected President of France by an electoral college. His Justice Minister Michel Debré became Prime Minister. The pro-Fifth Republic center-left parties (SFIO and Radical Party) left the presidential majority. This established the first gaullist centre-right government.

Results (Metropolitan France)

|-
! style="background-color:#E9E9E9;text-align:left;vertical-align:top;" rowspan=2 colspan=3 width=600 |Parties and coalitions
! style="background-color:#E9E9E9;text-align:center;" colspan=2 |1st round
! style="background-color:#E9E9E9;text-align:center;" colspan=2 |2nd round
! style="background-color:#E9E9E9" rowspan=2|Total seats
|-
! style="background-color:#E9E9E9;text-align:right;" |Votes
! style="background-color:#E9E9E9;text-align:right;" |%
! style="background-color:#E9E9E9;text-align:right;" |Votes
! style="background-color:#E9E9E9;text-align:right;" |%
|-
|style="background-color:#0000C8"|
| style="text-align:left;" | Union for the New Republic (Union pour la nouvelle République) and Gaullists
| style="text-align:right;" | UNR
| style="text-align:right;" | 3,603,958
| style="text-align:right;" | 17.6
| style="text-align:right;" | 4,769,052
| style="text-align:right;" | 26.4
| style="text-align:right;" | 189
|-
|style="background-color:#1E90FF"|
| style="text-align:left;" | National Center of Independents and Peasants (Centre national des indépendants et paysans) and Moderates
| style="text-align:right;" | CNIP
| style="text-align:right;" | 4,092,600
| style="text-align:right;" | 19.9
| style="text-align:right;" | 4,250,083
| style="text-align:right;" | 23.6
| style="text-align:right;" | 132
|-
|style="background-color:#00CCCC"|
| style="text-align:left;" | Popular Republican Movement (Mouvement républicain populaire) and Christian Democrats
| style="text-align:right;" | MRP
| style="text-align:right;" | 2,387,788
| style="text-align:right;" | 11.6
| style="text-align:right;" | 1,365,064
| style="text-align:right;" | 7.5
| style="text-align:right;" | 57
|-
|style="background-color:#E75480"|
| style="text-align:left;" | French Section of the Workers International (Section française de l'Internationale ouvrière)
| style="text-align:right;" | SFIO
| style="text-align:right;" | 3,167,354
| style="text-align:right;" | 15.5
| style="text-align:right;" | 2,484,417
| style="text-align:right;" | 13.8
| style="text-align:right;" | 40
|-
|style="background-color:#FFBF00"|
| style="text-align:left;" | Radical Party (Parti radical), Dissidents and Republican Center
| style="text-align:right;" | Rad
| style="text-align:right;" | 2,695,287
| style="text-align:right;" | 12.9
| style="text-align:right;" | 1,398,409
| style="text-align:right;" | 7.7
| style="text-align:right;" | 37
|-
|style="background-color:#FF0000"|
| style="text-align:left;" | French Communist Party (Parti communiste français)
| style="text-align:right;" | PCF
| style="text-align:right;" | 3,882,204
| style="text-align:right;" | 18.9
| style="text-align:right;" | 3,741,384
| style="text-align:right;" | 20.7
| style="text-align:right;" | 10
|-
|style="background-color:#704214"|
| style="text-align:left;" | Extreme Right
|
| style="text-align:right;" | 669,518
| style="text-align:right;" | 3.3
| style="text-align:right;" | -
| style="text-align:right;" | -
| style="text-align:right;" | 1
|-
|
| style="text-align:left;" | Total
|
| style="text-align:right;" | 20,489,709
| style="text-align:right;" | 99.7
| style="text-align:right;" | 
| style="text-align:right;" | 99.7
| style="text-align:right;" | 466
|-
|
| style="text-align:left;" colspan=8 | Abstention: 22.9% (1st round)
|}

Notes

References

 
 
 
 

1958
Legislative Election
November 1958 events in Europe